Fosses-la-Ville is a city and municipality of Wallonia located in the province of Namur, Belgium. 

On January 1, 2018, Fosses-la-Ville had a total population of 10,449. The total area is 63.24 km² which gives a population density of 165 inhabitants per km².

The municipality consists of the following districts: Aisemont, Fosses, Le Roux, Sart-Eustache, Sart-Saint-Laurent, and Vitrival.

Main sights

Collegiate church of Saint-Feuillen, rebuilt in the 18th century. It has maintained a Romanesque tower from the 10th century.
Chapelle Sainte-Brigide, a small sanctuary built by Irish monks, dedicated to Brigid of Kildare

Twin towns
 Orbey, France
 Robecco sul Naviglio, Italy

Gallery

References

External links
 
Official website

Cities in Wallonia
Municipalities of Namur (province)